Ordo (Latin "order, rank, class") may refer to:
 A musical phrase constructed from one or more statements of a rhythmic mode pattern and ending in a rest
 Big O notation in calculation of algorithm computational complexity
 Orda (organization), also ordo or horde, was a nomadic palace for the Mongol aristocrats and the Turkic rulers
 Order (biology), in the taxonomy of organisms
 Ordo Recitandi or directorium gives complete details of the celebration of the Eucharist and the Liturgy of the Hours, beginning with the first Sunday of Advent
 Religious order in monasticism
 The Inquisition from Warhammer 40,000 has three main ordines: Ordo Malleus, Ordo Hereticus and Ordo Xenos
 Ordo Templi Orientis, an organization dedicated to the religious philosophy of Thelema
 The scholarly economic/political science journal The ORDO Yearbook of Economic and Social Order
 Canderous Ordo, a fictional character in the Star Wars video games Star Wars: Knights of the Old Republic and Star Wars Knights of the Old Republic II: The Sith Lords
 A fictional encryption program from the book Cryptonomicon, by Neal Stephenson
 Novus ordo seclorum which appears on the reverse of the Great Seal of the United States
 Ordo Missae or Order of Mass, the order (regulation) of the Eucharist in the Roman Rite of the Catholic Church

See also
 Urdu